Persicaria chinensis (synonym Polygonum chinense), commonly known as creeping smartweed or Chinese knotweed, is a plant species from the family Polygonaceae. 
It is widespread across China, Japan, the Indian Subcontinent, Indonesia, Malaysia, and Vietnam. It is a common plant in Malaysia and Vietnam, where it is used in herbal remedies, such as for the treatment of dysentery, enteritis, and sore throat. It is a weed in some coastal areas of New South Wales and Queensland in Australia.

Persicaria chinensis is a perennial climber that grows to 2–3 m high. Its stems are glabrous and red-brown, with longitudinal stripes. Its leaves have oval blades, are 4–8 cm long and 3–5 cm wide, with pointed apex and round or nearly cordate base. Its cymes emerge at terminals, and are 5–7 cm long, with small white or pink flowers. Its fruits are berries, globose in shape and enclosed in the enlarged and fleshy calyx at maturity. They are edible and sour tasting. The seeds are small and black.

References

External links
Integrated Taxonomic Information System ITIS standard report, Polygonum chinense
line drawing, Flora of China Illustrations vol. 5, fig. 248, 1 

chinensis
Flora of Asia
Plants described in 1753
Taxa named by Carl Linnaeus